The 2009 Trinidad and Tobago Classic was the fifth season of the TOYOTA Classic, which is a knockout tournament competition for teams in the TT Pro League and the National Super League. The tournament took place at the conclusion of the 2009 season. San Juan Jabloteh entered as the tournament's defending champion. The tournament commenced on 30 October, with 16 teams competing in single elimination matches.

Qualification

Every club from the TT Pro League automatically qualified for the competition except for Tobago United who did not enter. In addition, following the conclusion of the National Super League season, the top six teams ranked according to the league table qualified. All teams entered the competition at the first round.

The draw for the first round for the fifth edition of the tournament was conducted by Pro League CEO Dexter Skeene on 28 October 2009, at the TOYOTA Trinidad and Tobago Limited Barataria showroom. The 16 teams in the competition, valued at TT$50,000 in total sponsorship, were drawn into four groups. All clubs were seeded based on their positions in their respective leagues.

St. Ann's Rangers, San Juan Jabloteh, Defence Force, and Joe Public were drawn as the top seeds in Groups A, B, C, and D, respectively.

The following clubs have qualified for this year's edition of the TOYOTA Classic:

Schedule
The schedule for the 2009 TOYOTA Classic, as announced by the TT Pro League and National Super League:

Bracket

Results
All matches were played over two 45 minutes halves, and in the process if the match were drawn at the end of regulation time, penalty kicks determined the winner.

First round
On the competition's opening night, W Connection dumped Caledonia AIA out of the tournament with a 3–0 victory on penalty kicks after each team scored a goal in regulation. There were no other surprises as Joe Public easily defeated Police, Ma Pau claimed a 2–1 victory over Joe Public (SL), and St. Ann's Rangers used a late Jahvon Morris goal to advance past fellow Pro League side FC South End. On the following day, Defence Force defeated T&TEC by a score 3–0, whereas San Juan Jabloteh mauled Defence Force (SL) 5–0 to advance to the quarterfinals.

Quarterfinals
San Juan Jabloteh survived a scoreless match after regulation to defeat Petrotrin on penalties 3–2 and advanced to the semifinals. Likewise, St. Ann's Rangers needed eight penalty kicks to defeat the lone National Super League team left in the tournament, 1976 FC Phoenix. Ma Pau and Joe Public continued their run to the semifinals with wins over Pro League sides W Connection and Defence Force respectively.

Semifinals
Jabloteh held off St. Ann's Rangers 4–3 following two late goals from Rangers to advance to the final on 13 November. In the other semifinal match, Joe Public edged Ma Pau on penalties to meet Jabloteh in the final.

Final
Joe Public claimed the title on 13 November with a 4–0 mauling of Jabloteh at Marvin Lee Stadium. Although Jabloteh lost in the final, teammates Marvin Oliver and Noel Williams walked away as the tournament's top goal scorers with four goals each.

References

External links
Official Website

2009 TOYOTA Classic
Trinidad and Tobago Classic
Classic